The 1995 Individual Long Track World Championship was the 25th edition of the FIM speedway Individual Long Track World Championship. The event was held on 17 September 1995 at the Eichenring motorcycle speedway arena in Scheeßel, Germany.

The world title was won by Kelvin Tatum of England after he defeated five times champion Simon Wigg in a run off for the gold medal.

Final Classification 

 E = eliminated (no further ride)
 f = fell
 ef = engine failure
 x = excluded

Gold Medal
 Run-off Tatum beat Wigg

References 

1995
Speedway competitions in Germany
Motor
Motor